The Sutyagin House (Dom Sutyagina; also called Деревянный небоскрёб, "wooden skyscraper", or Соломбальский небоскрёб, "Solombala skyscraper") was a wooden house in Arkhangelsk, Russia.

The 13-story,  residence of the local crime lord Nikolai Petrovich Sutyagin was reported to be the world's, or at least Russia's, tallest wooden house, exceeding even the height of Kizhi Pogost, the tallest wooden church in Russia. Constructed by Mr. Sutyagin and his family over 15 years (starting in 1992), without formal plans or a building permit, the structure deteriorated while Sutyagin spent a number of years in prison for racketeering.

In 2008, it was condemned by the city as a fire hazard, and the courts ordered it to be fully demolished by February 1, 2009.  On December 26, 2008, the tower was pulled down, and the remainder was dismantled manually over the course of the next several months. The remaining four-story structure burned to the ground on May 6, 2012.

See also
 Illegal construction
 Vernacular architecture

References

External links
 The Daily Telegraph - Gangster who built world's tallest log cabin

Buildings and structures in Arkhangelsk
Demolished buildings and structures in Russia
Houses in Russia
Organized crime in Russia
Wooden houses
Wooden buildings and structures in Russia
Visionary environments
Buildings and structures demolished in 2008